Kobiałka is a neighbourhood, and an area of the Municipal Information System, in the city of Warsaw, Poland, located within the district of Białołęka.

History 
In 20th century, Kobiałka was a small village near the city of Warsaw. It was incorporated into Warsaw on 1 August 1977.

References 

Neighbourhoods of Białołęka